The  (SEV or Spanish Society of Vexillology) is an association devoted to the study of flags. Based in Spain, most of its members are Spanish-speaking vexillologists. Founded on 31 October 1977, the Spanish Society of Vexillology is a member of the Fédération internationale des associations vexillologiques (FIAV) since 1979. In 1985 the Spanish Society of Vexillology hosted the XI International Congress of Vexillology with Madrid as the venue.

The Spanish Society of Vexillology distributes among its members a publication every month: 4 times a year the publication is the magazine Banderas, and 8 times a year, the bulletin Gaceta de banderas.

The Society also organizes every year, since 1986, a national congress of vexillology in Spain.

External links
SEV Home page

International Federation of Vexillological Associations